Lee Albert Rubel ( – ) was a mathematician known for his contributions to analog computing.

Career
Originally from New York, he held a Doctorate of Mathematics degree from University of Wisconsin-Madison, and was professor of Mathematics at University of Illinois at Urbana-Champaign since 1954.

He wrote for several scientific publications like the Complex Variables and Elliptic Equations International Journal, the Constructive Approximation mathematical journal, the American Mathematical Monthly, the Journal of Differential Equations, the Journal of Approximation Theory, the Journal of Symbolic Logic, the Journal of the Australian Mathematical Society. He also collaborated to the Functional Analysis periodical, the Tohoku Mathematical, the Mathematical Proceedings of the Cambridge Philosophical Society, the Franklin Institute-engineering and Applied Mathematics, Combinatorica, Israel Journal of Mathematics, and Journal of Theoretical Neurobiology, among others.

He was a member of the American Mathematical Society for 43 years, which published many of his papers in the Proceedings of the AMS.

He died on March 25, 1995 in Urbana, Illinois.

Academic publications

References

20th-century American mathematicians
University of Illinois Urbana-Champaign faculty
University of Wisconsin–Madison College of Letters and Science alumni
1928 births
1995 deaths